Note: This is a list of films that feature extraterrestrial life.

See also
 List of fictional extraterrestrials
UFOs in fiction

References

External links

 
Extraterrestrials, list of films featuring
Extraterrestrial
Extraterrestrials
 

it:Extraterrestri nella fantascienza#Filmografia